Emanuel Büchel (August 18, 1705 – September 24, 1775) was a Swiss painter.

Büchel's watercolor paintings  are known for their use of bright colors. The high point of his career came in 1773, when he was commissioned to reproduce the painting 'The Dance of Death in Basel.' But the project was very difficult to execute because the original painting had undergone countless renovations and changes. Also, it was damaged to a great extent. Although Büchel worked on it and gave the painting his characteristic touch of vivacious colors, the painting's poor conditions meant that it only survived 32 more years after Büchel's renovations.

Luckily, another of Büchel's works has survived. It is the 'Dance of Death'. This mural, which he painted on the wall of the Kleinbasel churchyard, has survived numerous onslaughts over the years. Situated inside an abandoned nunnery, the mural has had better protection against weather, wear and tear, iconoclasms and renovations as compared to some of Büchel's other works. Although the mural is only an imitation of a medieval painting that Büchel saw in 1768, it has acquired special significance since the original painting has now been lost. Büchel's works, therefore, is the only source for ascertaining what the original painting looked like. Büchel created two sets of his water colors. One is housed in Kunstsammlung Basel and the other is in the university's library.

References

18th-century Swiss painters
18th-century Swiss male artists
Swiss male painters
1705 births
1775 deaths